Elections for the former Indian state of Jammu and Kashmir were held in September -October 2002 in four phases.

Jammu & Kashmir National Conference was the single largest party but lacked majority. The Jammu and Kashmir People's Democratic Party (PDP) and the Indian National Congress (Congress) formed a coalition government with PDP's  Mufti Mohammad Sayeed serving as the Chief Minister for the first three years and Congress's Ghulam Nabi Azad for the next three years. The election saw a major boycott at the appeal of Tehreek -e-Hurriyat.Kashmir division had a voting percentage of 3.5% while Jammu division had a voting percentage of 16.5%.Rajouri district recorded the least voting percentage at 2.7% The Panthers Party formed part of the ruling coalition with Harsh Dev Singh as the party's first cabinet minister.

Electronic Voting Machines (EVMs) were used for first time in Jammu Kashmir assembly elections in 2002. The international community also appreciated the credibility of the elections and the results that followed it. The elections was seen as a victory of the ballot over the bullet. United States lauded 2002 elections of the state. There were 1.7 million voters in the state for 2002 elections.

Voting

The first phase voting took place on 16 September 2002. There was a polling station for just 11 voters in Zanskar. BJP contested on 52 seats while Jammu State Morcha contested on 12 seats. National Conference president Omar Abdullah contested from Ganderbal seat. Separatists had varied views on the elections ranging from voting to boycott of elections.

The four stages of the elections were held as follows:

Results 

!colspan=10|
|-
! style="background-color:#E9E9E9;text-align:center;" |Party
! style="background-color:#E9E9E9;text-align:center;" |Seats
! style="background-color:#E9E9E9;text-align:center;" |Previously
! style="background-color:#E9E9E9;text-align:center;" |+/–
! style="background-color:#E9E9E9;text-align:center;" |Vote %
! style="background-color:#E9E9E9;text-align:center;" |Vote Share
|-
| style="text-align:left;" |National Conference
| style="text-align:right;vertical-align:top;" | 28
| style="text-align:right;vertical-align:top;" | 57
| style="text-align:right;vertical-align:top;" | -29
| style="text-align:right;vertical-align:top;" | 20.8%
| style="text-align:right;vertical-align:top;" | 7,49,825
|-
| style="text-align:left;" |Indian National Congress
| style="text-align:right;vertical-align:top;" | 20
| style="text-align:right;vertical-align:top;" | 7
| style="text-align:right;vertical-align:top;" | +13
| style="text-align:right;vertical-align:top;" | 24.24%
| style="text-align:right;vertical-align:top;" | 6,43,751
|-
| style="text-align:left;" |People's Democratic Party
| style="text-align:right;vertical-align:top;" | 16
| style="text-align:right;vertical-align:top;" | -
| style="text-align:right;vertical-align:top;" | +16
| style="text-align:right;vertical-align:top;" | 9.28%
| style="text-align:right;vertical-align:top;" | 2,46,480
|-
| style="text-align:left;" |Jammu & Kashmir National Panthers Party
| style="text-align:right;vertical-align:top;" | 4
| style="text-align:right;vertical-align:top;" | 1
| style="text-align:right;vertical-align:top;" | +3
| style="text-align:right;vertical-align:top;" | 3.83%
| style="text-align:right;vertical-align:top;" | 1,01,830
|-
| style="text-align:left;" |Communist Party of India (Marxist)
| style="text-align:right;vertical-align:top;" | 2
| style="text-align:right;vertical-align:top;" | 
| style="text-align:right;vertical-align:top;" | 0
| style="text-align:right;vertical-align:top;" | 0.88%
| style="text-align:right;vertical-align:top;" | 23493
|-
| style="text-align:left;" |Bharatiya Janata Party
| style="text-align:right;vertical-align:top;" | 1
| style="text-align:right;vertical-align:top;" | 8
| style="text-align:right;vertical-align:top;" | -7
| style="text-align:right;vertical-align:top;" | 8.57%
| style="text-align:right;vertical-align:top;" | 2,27,633
|-
| style="text-align:left;" |Bahujan Samaj Party
| style="text-align:right;vertical-align:top;" | 1
| style="text-align:right;vertical-align:top;" | 4
| style="text-align:right;vertical-align:top;" | -3
| style="text-align:right;vertical-align:top;" | 4.50% 
| style="text-align:right;vertical-align:top;" | 1,19,492
|-
| style="text-align:left;" |Democratic Movement
| style="text-align:right;vertical-align:top;" | 1
| style="text-align:right;vertical-align:top;" | 
| style="text-align:right;vertical-align:top;" | 
| style="text-align:right;vertical-align:top;" | 0.62%
| style="text-align:right;vertical-align:top;" | 16,366
|-
| style="text-align:left;" |Jammu and Kashmir Awami League
| style="text-align:right;vertical-align:top;" | 1
| style="text-align:right;vertical-align:top;" | 1
| style="text-align:right;vertical-align:top;" | 0
| style="text-align:right;vertical-align:top;" | 0.91%
| style="text-align:right;vertical-align:top;" | 24,121
|-
| style="text-align:left;" | Independents
| style="text-align:right;vertical-align:top;" | 13
| style="text-align:right;vertical-align:top;" | 
| style="text-align:right;vertical-align:top;" | 
| style="text-align:right;vertical-align:top;" | %
| style="text-align:right;vertical-align:top;" | 4,38,287
|-
| style="text-align:left;background-color:#E9E9E9" |Total (turnout 43.70%)
! style="text-align:right;background-color:#E9E9E9"| 87
! style="text-align:right;background-color:#E9E9E9"| 87
! style="text-align:right;background-color:#E9E9E9"|  
! style="text-align:right;background-color:#E9E9E9"| -
! style="text-align:right;background-color:#E9E9E9"| -
|-
! colspan="9" |
|-
| style="text-align:left;" colspan="2" |Valid votes
| align="right" |26,55,570
| align="right" |99.90
| colspan="4" rowspan="5" style="background-color:#E9E9E9"  |
|-
| style="text-align:left;" colspan="2" |Invalid votes
| align="right" |584
| align="right" |0.10
|-
| style="text-align:left;" colspan="2" |Votes cast / turnout
| align="right" |26,56,627
| align="right" |43.70 
|-
| style="text-align:left;" colspan="2" |Abstentions
| align="right" | 24,94,170
| align="right" | 56.30%
|-
| style="text-align:left;" colspan="2" |Registered voters
| align="right" | 60,78,570 
|colspan="1" style="background-color:#E9E9E9"|
|-
|-
| style="text-align:left;" colspan=12 |Source:Election Commission of India
|}

JKNC became the single largest party with 28 seats. Congress became the second largest party with 25 seats.

Omar Abdullah resigned as a chief minister on 24 December 2014.

Elected Members

References

Jammu and Kashmir
2002
2002